Under the Whyte notation for the classification of steam locomotive wheel arrangements, a 2-10-10-2 is a locomotive with two leading wheels, two sets of ten driving wheels, and a pair of trailing wheels.

Other equivalent classifications are:
UIC classification: 1EE1 (also known as German classification and Swiss classification)
Italian and French classification: 150+051
Turkish classification: 56+56
Swiss classification: 5/6+5/6

The equivalent UIC classification is refined to (1′E)E1′ for Mallet locomotives. All 2-10-10-2 locomotives have been articulated locomotives of the Mallet type.

This wheel arrangement was rare. Only two classes of 2-10-10-2 locomotives have been built: the Atchison, Topeka and Santa Fe Railway's 3000 class, and the Virginian Railway's class AE. The 3000 class performed poorly, so the railroad returned them to their original 2-10-2 configuration after no more than seven years of service. None survive today. The class AE locomotives were much more successful, providing between 25 and 31 years of service; some were scrapped between 1943 and 1945, and the rest were scrapped between 1947 and 1949. None were preserved.

ATSF 3000 class 

In 1911 and 1912,  the Atchison, Topeka and Santa Fe Railway modified 10 2-10-2 Baldwin-built locomotives into a new 2-10-10-2 configuration dubbed the 3000 class. They were the largest locomotives in the world from their introduction until 1914. They performed well in helper service, but could only go  before losing steam. The ATSF returned them to their 2-10-2 configurations between 1915 and 1918.

Virginian Railway class AE 

These ten locomotives were built in 1918 by ALCO for the Virginian Railway. The  low-pressure cylinders (on  centers) were the largest on any U.S. locomotive; the cylinders had to be inclined a few degrees to provide clearance. Their accompanying fuel tenders were shorter than usual so the locomotive would fit on the Virginian's turntables.

This class were compound Mallet locomotives. The rear, high-pressure cylinders exhausted their steam into the huge front cylinders.  They could also be operated in simple mode for starting; reduced-pressure steam could be sent straight from the boiler to the front cylinders at low speed, for maximum tractive effort.

The class remained in service until the 1940s. No locomotive example of this type survived into preservation.

References

External links 

1010,2-10-10-2
3000
AE
Steam locomotives of the United States
Railway locomotives introduced in 1911